Salt Spring Valley Reservoir is an artificial lake formed by the construction of Salt Springs Valley Dam across Rock Creek in the Bear Mountains of Calaveras County, California.

See also
List of lakes in California

References

External links
 
 

Reservoirs in Calaveras County, California
Reservoirs in California
Reservoirs in Northern California